Wallenstein is a 1925 German silent historical film directed by Rolf Randolf and starring Fritz Greiner, Eduard von Winterstein, and Ernst Rückert. The film's sets were designed by the art director Robert A. Dietrich.

It depicts the life of the Imperial General Albrecht von Wallenstein during the Thirty Years War. It was released in two separate parts, as was common for epics during the era.

Cast

References

Bibliography

External links

1925 films
1920s historical films
1920s biographical films
German historical films
German biographical films
Films of the Weimar Republic
Films directed by Rolf Randolf
German silent feature films
Films set in the 1630s
Films based on works by Friedrich Schiller
Films set in the Holy Roman Empire
Thirty Years' War in popular culture
German black-and-white films
Cultural depictions of Albrecht von Wallenstein
Cultural depictions of Gustavus Adolphus of Sweden
1920s German films